Tne Primetime Emmy Award for Outstanding Makeup for a Single-Camera Series (Non-Prosthetic) is a retired award that was presented as part of the Primetime Emmy Awards. The awards were reorganized in 2020 to recognize Outstanding Contemporary Makeup (Non-Prosthetic) and Outstanding Period and/or Character Makeup (Non-Prosthetic).

In the following list, the first titles listed in gold are the winners; those not in gold are nominees, which are listed in alphabetical order. The years given are those in which the ceremonies took place:



Winners and nominations

1960s
Outstanding Individual Achievement in the Visual Arts (Makeup)

1970s
Outstanding Achievement in Makeup

1980s

Outstanding Makeup for a Series

1990s

2000s

Outstanding Makeup for a Series (Non-Prosthetic)
The award was divided to recognize Makeup for a Series (Non-Prosthetic) and Prosthetic Makeup for a Series.

Outstanding Makeup for a Single-Camera Series (Non-Prosthetic)
Beginning in 2008, the award was split to honor Single-Camera Series and Outstanding Makeup for a Multi-Camera Series or Special (Non-Prosthetic).

2010s

2020s

Programs with multiple awards

5 awards
 Game of Thrones

3 awards
 The X-Files

2 awards
 Deadwood
 Star Trek: Deep Space Nine
 Star Trek: The Next Generation
 The Tracey Ullman Show
 Westworld

Programs with multiple nominations

9 nominations
 Star Trek: The Next Generation

8 nominations
 Game of Thrones
 Mad Men

7 nominations
 Star Trek: Deep Space Nine

6 nominations
 CSI: Crime Scene Investigation

5 nominations
 Boardwalk Empire
 Glee
 The X-Files

4 nominations
 Babylon 5
 Beauty and the Beast
 Buffy the Vampire Slayer
 Grey's Anatomy
 Nip/Tuck
 Star Trek: Voyager
 The Tracey Ullman Show

3 nominations
 Deadwood
 Tracey Takes On...
 Vikings

2 nominations
 Alias
 Amazing Stories
 Carnivàle
 Dr. Quinn, Medicine Woman
 GLOW
 The Knick
 Kung Fu
 Penny Dreadful
 Pushing Daisies
 Rome
 Sex and the City
 Six Feet Under
 Tales from the Crypt
 This Is Us
 Westworld

Notes

References

Makeup for a Single-Camera Series (Non-Prosthetic)
Awards disestablished in 2020
Awards established in 1965
Makeup awards